Cogswell is a city in Sargent County, North Dakota, United States. The population was 73 at the 2020 census. Cogswell was founded in 1890.

Geography
Cogswell is located at  (46.107063, -97.782963).

Demographics

2010 census
As of the census of 2010, there were 99 people, 50 households, and 30 families residing in the city. The racial makeup of the city was 94.9% White and 5.1% Native American.

There were 50 households, of which 14.0% had children under the age of 18 living with them, 50.0% were married couples living together, 4.0% had a female householder with no husband present, 6.0% had a male householder with no wife present, and 40.0% were non-families. 38.0% of all households were made up of individuals, and 14% had someone living alone who was 65 years of age or older. The average household size was 1.98 and the average family size was 2.53.

The median age in the city was 52.1 years. 14.1% of residents were under the age of 18; 3.1% were between the ages of 18 and 24; 9% were from 25 to 44; 56.6% were from 45 to 64; and 17.2% were 65 years of age or older. The gender makeup of the city was 57.6% male and 42.4% female.

2000 census
As of the census of 2000, there were 165 people, 68 households, and 49 families residing in the city. The population density was 493.4 people per square mile (193.1/km2). There were 81 housing units at an average density of 242.2 per square mile (94.8/km2). The racial makeup of the city was 99.39% White, and 0.61% from two or more races. Hispanic or Latino of any race were 1.82% of the population.

There were 68 households, out of which 33.8% had children under the age of 18 living with them, 63.2% were married couples living together, 1.5% had a female householder with no husband present, and 27.9% were non-families. 27.9% of all households were made up of individuals, and 17.6% had someone living alone who was 65 years of age or older. The average household size was 2.43 and the average family size was 2.92.

In the city, the population was spread out, with 26.1% under the age of 18, 6.7% from 18 to 24, 29.1% from 25 to 44, 23.0% from 45 to 64, and 15.2% who were 65 years of age or older. The median age was 39 years. For every 100 females, there were 103.7 males. For every 100 females age 18 and over, there were 106.8 males.

The median income for a household in the city was $35,000, and the median income for a family was $45,208. Males had a median income of $31,250 versus $19,375 for females. The per capita income for the city was $14,086. About 1.8% of families and 2.5% of the population were below the poverty line, including none of those under the age of eighteen and 7.1% of those 65 or over.

References

Cities in North Dakota
Cities in Sargent County, North Dakota
Populated places established in 1890
1890 establishments in North Dakota